The Kambure, more commonly known now as Gamberre, were an Aboriginal Australian people of the Kimberley region of Western Australia.

Language
The Kambure spoke a dialect of Wunambal.

Country
Norman Tindal estimated Kambure lands to extend over some  around the Admiralty Gulf, excluding the areas around the Osborne Islands. Their eastern boundary lay about Monger Creek in Napier Broome Bay. Their southern extension ran along the south rim of the King Edward River.

History of contact
An area of Kambure territory had a sacred value for them in their dreaming, yet was thought to require patrolling by the Australian Army. The compromise worked out was to enroll several Kambure boys as army scouts, who, knowing the lay of the ground, could assist the special patrols in carrying out their coastal surveillance.

People
The Kambure were a coastal people, who subsisted on marine products. One Kambure horde lived on Sir Graham Moore Island.

Alternative names
 Kambera.
 Kamberange.
 Kanbre, Gambre.
 Barurungari. ('upland'/plateau people').
 Kambumiri.
 Purungari. (a Worrorra exonym meaning 'coast people').

Notes

Citations

Sources

Aboriginal peoples of Western Australia